is a 2013 Japanese television drama broadcast by WOWOW and produced by Tsuburaya Productions as the 24th entry in the Ultra Series. It is billed as a second season of the 1966 drama Ultra Q, which began the Ultra Series. It premiered on January 12, 2013.

On July 25, 2017, Toku announced that the series would air in the United States on its channel with English subtitles beginning August 15, 2017. The series was released on Blu Ray in the US by Millcreek Entertainment on August 11, 2020.

Cast

List of episodes

Japanese airdate: January 12, 2013
American airdate: August 15, 2017

Japanese airdate: January 19, 2013
American airdate: August 16, 2017

Japanese airdate: January 26, 2013
American airdate: August 17, 2017

Japanese airdate: February 2, 2013
American airdate: August 18, 2017

Japanese airdate: February 9, 2013
American airdate: August 21, 2017

Japanese airdate: February 16, 2013
American airdate: August 22, 2017

Japanese airdate: February 23, 2013
American airdate: August 23, 2017

Japanese airdate: March 3, 2013
American airdate: August 24, 2017

Japanese airdate: March 9, 2013
American airdate: August 25, 2017

Japanese airdate: March 16, 2013
American airdate: August 28, 2017

Japanese airdate: March 23, 2013
American airdate: August 29, 2017

Japanese airdate: March 30, 2013
American airdate: August 30, 2017

References

External links
Official website

Ultra Q
2013 Japanese television series debuts
Japanese anthology television series
Television series about alien visitations
Wowow original programming
2013 Japanese television series endings